The 4th constituency of the Nord is a French legislative constituency in the Nord département.

Description

Nord's 4th constituency covers the north and western portions of the city of Lille as well as the town of Quesnoy-sur-Deûle which lies close to the border with Belgium.

Until 2017, the seat was held by parties of the right since 1988 and by Marc-Philippe Daubresse since 1990. As Marc-Philippe Daubresse has been called up to serve in the government on two occasions, firstly under Jean-Pierre Raffarin and then under François Fillon, his chosen substitute Jacques Houssin has also represented the seat during that period.

Historic Representation

Election results

2022

 
 
 
 
 
 
 
 
|-
| colspan="8" bgcolor="#E9E9E9"|
|-

2017

2012

 
 
 
 
|-
| colspan="8" bgcolor="#E9E9E9"|
|-

2007

 
 
 
 
 
 
|-
| colspan="8" bgcolor="#E9E9E9"|
|-

2005 by-election

2002

 
 
 
 
 
|-
| colspan="8" bgcolor="#E9E9E9"|
|-

1997

 
 
 
 
 
 
 
|-
| colspan="8" bgcolor="#E9E9E9"|
|-

Sources
Official results of French elections from 1998: 

4